Valley First, a division of First West Credit Union, is based in British Columbia, Canada. Founded in Penticton in 1947 as the Penticton and District Credit Union, Valley First was established in 1983 following a period of expansion through the Okanagan and Similkameen valleys. Valley First continued its growth into the Kelowna market throughout the 1990s, before amalgamating with the Armstrong Spallumcheen Savings and Credit Union and buying the KCP Credit Union in Kamloops in 2001.

In 2008, Valley First entered into discussions with Langley-based Envision Financial to merge with one another and develop a new financial services organization for Western Canada. In September 2009, members at both credit unions voted in favour of the merger proposal, and on Jan. 1, 2010, Envision Financial and Valley First merged to become First West Credit Union. In 2013, Enderby & District Credit Union joined First West Credit Union, followed by Island Savings Credit Union in 2015.

First West Credit Union has $14 billion in total assets and assets under management, approximately 1,250 employees and more than 250,000 members. The credit union is the third largest in B.C. and the fifth largest in Canada. Its divisions—Envision Financial, Valley First, Island Savings and Enderby & District Financial—operate under their existing brand names in their respective markets.

Overview
Valley First has a network of 14 branches throughout the Okanagan, Similkameen and Thompson valleys. Its regional administration center is located in Penticton.

In 2010, Valley First launched its signature cause, Feed the Valley. Feed the Valley is a unique hunger fighting initiative that aims to raise food, funds and awareness for food banks in the Valley First trade area. With the ultimate goal of eliminating hunger in the Okanagan, Similkameen and Thompson valleys, Feed the Valley has collected more than 96,000 pounds of food and raised the equivalent of 7,146,000 meals and more than $2,380,000, all supporting local food banks.

Merger
In 2008, Valley First entered into discussions with Langley-based Envision Credit Union to merge with one another and develop a new financial services organization for Western Canada.

In September 2009, members at both credit unions voted in favour of the merger proposal, and on Jan. 1, 2010, Valley First and Envision merged to become First West Credit Union.

Membership
Valley First is a division of First West Credit Union, which is a member of Central 1 Credit Union and is registered with the Credit Union Deposit Insurance Corporation of BC.

References

External links
 Official website

First West Credit Union
Financial services companies of Canada
Penticton
Financial services companies based in British Columbia
Credit unions of British Columbia